Paul Pétard (1912–1980) was a French botanist who specialized in the study of native plants of French Polynesia. His book Petard Botanical Plant Encyclopedia is still widely used as a reference, and contains much information about traditional applications of Tahitian Noni juice. He held a doctorate in pharmacy.

1912 births
1980 deaths
20th-century French botanists
Botanists active in the Pacific
Ethnobotanists